Stephen Griew (1928 – 2 October 2010) was the third President of Athabasca University He was born in London, and also served at University of Toronto and Murdoch University.

References

Presidents of Athabasca University
Academic staff of the University of Toronto
1928 births
2010 deaths